The Church of the Assumption is a Roman Catholic church in Jajce, Bosnia and Herzegovina.

References 

Jajce